Elections were held in the Australian state of Queensland on 15 April 1944 to elect the 62 members of the state's Legislative Assembly.

The election was the first that Labor had contested under Premier Frank Cooper, who had been in office for 19 months by the time of the poll.

From this election, the voting method was changed from contingency voting to First past the post voting. Queensland retained this method for state elections until Preferential Voting was restored by the Country/Liberal Coalition at the 1963 state election.

The election resulted in Labor receiving a fifth term in office, albeit with a reduced majority.

Key dates

Results

Parties and independents
Some ructions had developed between some sections of the Labor Party and the party's AWU-dominated executive, resulting in tiny splinter movements which were, however, locally effective. The Hermit Park branch in Townsville, which had dominated the Townsville City Council since 1939, was expelled from the ALP for alleged disloyalty in 1942, possibly due to association with Communists. Tom Aikens won the seat of Mundingburra at the election. Similar forces saw sitting left-wing members George Taylor (Enoggera) and George Marriott (Bulimba) expelled from the party; the former lost his seat to a QPP candidate, while the latter retained his at the 1944 and 1947 elections. Frank Barnes, a colourful identity who supported social credit theories popular since the Great Depression and declared himself opposed to the Labor government, retained his seat of Bundaberg.

Various changes were taking place in conservative politics as well, with the dissolution of the United Australia Party and the formation of the Queensland People's Party (QPP), led by the mayor of Brisbane and member for Hamilton, John Beals Chandler. The two independent conservatives elected in 1941 were both out of parliament by the election — Bruce Pie had resigned to contest the 1943 federal election, whilst William Deacon had died. One of the former United Australia Party members, Louis Luckins (Maree), did not join the QPP originally and retained his seat in 1944 as an independent.

Apart from the above, numerous independent candidates contested with a range of banners, including Democrat, Christian Socialist, Servicemen's Association, People's Party and Independent Country Party, none of them achieving more than a few hundred votes.

Fred Paterson was elected in Bowen, the only member of the Communist Party of Australia to be elected to an Australian parliament.

Seats changing party representation

This table lists changes in party representation at the 1944 election.

 Members listed in italics did not recontest their seats.
 The sitting Independent Country member for Cunningham, William Deacon died in 1943. No by-election was held due to the proximity of the state election.
 In addition, Frank Barnes Labor held the seat of Cairns, which it had won from Labor at the 1942 by-election.

See also
 Members of the Queensland Legislative Assembly, 1941–1944
 Members of the Queensland Legislative Assembly, 1944–1947
 Candidates of the Queensland state election, 1944
 Cooper Ministry

References
Notes

Citations

Elections in Queensland
1944 elections in Australia
1940s in Queensland
April 1944 events